George Matthew Johnson (born 1985), more commonly known as George M. Johnson, is a queer Black American author, journalist, and activist. They are best known as the author of the memoir-manifesto All Boys Aren't Blue.

Early life and education 
Johnson spent their early childhood in New Jersey and later, Virginia. They described their family as loving and affirming of Johnson prior to them officially coming out at age 25. Johnson attended the HBCU Virginia Union University, where they became a member of Alpha Phi Alpha. They attended graduate school at Bowie State University.

Career 
Johnson's writing has appeared in Teen Vogue, Entertainment Tonight, NBC, The Root, Buzzfeed, Essence, Ebony, them., and The Grio.

They gained wider prominence for their memoir-manifesto All Boys Aren't Blue (2020). The book is a collection of coming-of-age essays describing Johnson's memories of growing up with particular focus on their Black, queer identity. The essays center pivotal experiences, including affirming relationships with family members, their understanding of masculinity, sexual encounters, and experiences of sexual abuse. The book was selected for YALSA's Teens' Top 10 and the ALA's Ranbow List, and received a starred review from Kirkus. The Root included Johnson on their list "100 Most Influential African Americans in 2020."

As of November 2021, All Boys Aren't Blue was one of the most frequent targets of book bans and challenges amid an "unprecedented" period of book banning according to ALA. It was removed from libraries in eight states due to claims of "sexual obscenity" for its descriptions of queer sex and masturbation. In response to the claims, Johnson stressed the sexual education value of the book and context for those descriptions, saying in a Time interview, "I am using my story to teach kids about the mistakes that I made the first time that I was having sex, so they don’t make those same mistakes. I am teaching kids about not feeling guilty when sexual abuse happens, and how to recognize sexual abuse...And how to fight back against those traumas that you can hold on to for so very long. So they’re leaving very, very important context out, intentionally of course, to try and say my book is pornographic."

In 2021 they released a second memoir, We Are Not Broken, focused on Black boyhood and their grandmother, Nanny. The book was named a secondary honoree for the Carter G. Woodson Book Award.

Personal life 
Johnson is queer and non-binary.

Works 
 The They Don't Teach You About College (2016)
 All Boys Aren't Blue (2020) 
 We Are Not Broken (2021)
 Black Boy Joy: 17 Stories Celebrating Black Boyhood (contributor) (2021)
 Property of No State (2022)
 Stonewall, illustrated by Theo Lorenz (2022)
 Five Second Violation (2023)

Awards and honors

References

External links 
 Official website
 Twitter

Living people
American gay writers
Virginia Union University alumni
Alpha Phi Alpha members
21st-century African-American writers
Writers from New Jersey
LGBT African Americans
Queer writers
Bowie State University alumni
21st-century American memoirists
LGBT people from New Jersey
1985 births
American non-binary writers